Neve Hadassah (lit. Hadassah Abode) is a youth village in central Israel. Located in the Sharon plain near Netanya and adjacent to Tel Yitzhak, it falls under the jurisdiction of Hof HaSharon Regional Council. In 2006 it had a population of 668.

The village was established in 1949 by Tel Yitzhak, Yesodot, Youth Aliyah, and Hadassah. It contains a boarding school and a school catering for pupils from 7th to 12th grade. Over the years, the school has taught immigrants from Latin America, the former Soviet Union and France.

Youth villages in Israel
Populated places established in 1949
Populated places in Central District (Israel)